Exeter is a village in Scott County, Illinois, United States. The population was 70 at the 2000 census. It is part of the Jacksonville Micropolitan Statistical Area.

Geography
Exeter is located at  (39.719091, −90.496028).

History 
Exeter was given the name of the origin of its founders, Exeter, New Hampshire.

The Potawatomi Trail of Death passed through here in 1838.

Demographics

As of the census of 2000, there were 70 people, 27 households, and 17 families residing in the village. The racial makeup of the village was 98.57% White and 1.43% Native American.

There were 27 households, out of which 29.6% had children under the age of 18 living with them, 44.4% were married couples living together, 14.8% had a female householder with no husband present, and 37.0% were non-families. 25.9% of all households were made up of individuals, and 7.4% had someone living alone who was 65 years of age or older. The average household size was 2.59 and the average family size was 3.29.

In the village, the population was spread out, with 20.0% under the age of 18, 15.7% from 18 to 24, 22.9% from 25 to 44, 28.6% from 45 to 64, and 12.9% who were 65 years of age or older. The median age was 41 years. For every 100 females, there were 125.8 males. For every 100 females age 18 and over, there were 100.0 males.

The median income for a household in the village was $46,875, and the median income for a family was $51,250. Males had a median income of $26,250 versus $18,036 for females. The per capita income for the village was $18,968. None of the population and none of the families were below the poverty line.

References

Villages in Scott County, Illinois
Villages in Illinois
Jacksonville, Illinois micropolitan area